Janice Kay Brewer (née Drinkwine, formerly Warren; born September 26, 1944) is an American politician and author who was the 22nd governor of Arizona from 2009 to 2015. A member of the Republican Party, Brewer is the fourth woman (and was the third consecutive woman) to be Governor of Arizona. Brewer assumed the governorship as part of the line of succession, as determined by the Arizona Constitution, when Governor Janet Napolitano resigned to become U.S. Secretary of Homeland Security. Brewer had been Secretary of State of Arizona from January 2003 to January 2009.

Born in California, Brewer attended Glendale Community College, from where she received a radiological technologist certificate. She has never earned a college degree. She was a state representative and state senator for Arizona from 1983 to 1996. She was chairman of the Maricopa County Board of Supervisors before running for Arizona secretary of state in 2002.

As governor, Brewer signed the Support Our Law Enforcement and Safe Neighborhoods Act. The act makes it a state misdemeanor crime for a noncitizen to be in Arizona without carrying registration documents required by federal law, authorizes state and local law enforcement of federal immigration laws and cracks down on those sheltering, hiring and transporting illegal immigrants. Brewer sought and was elected to a full term as governor of Arizona in 2010.

Early life, education and family

Brewer was born Janice Kay Drinkwine on September 26, 1944, in Hollywood, Los Angeles, the daughter of Edna C. (née Bakken) and Perry Wilford Drinkwine, then a civilian supervisor at the Hawthorne Army Depot in Hawthorne, Nevada. Brewer is of English and Norwegian descent. Her maternal grandfather, Emil Theodore Bakken, was from Norway; her maternal grandmother, Carrie Nelson, was from Minnesota, the daughter of Norwegian immigrants. Her paternal grandmother, Sarah Rosina Ford (née  Wilford), was an Englishwoman from Buckinghamshire.

Brewer and her older brother, Paul, lived in Hawthorne until she was ten years old, when the family moved to California, seeking "dry desert air and clean ocean breezes". Her father died of lung disease when she was eleven years old, having been ravaged by the constant exposure to chemicals while at the depot. She graduated from Verdugo Hills High School in 1962. Brewer attended Glendale Community College in Glendale, Arizona, where she received a radiological technologist certificate.

She married John Leon Brewer in Nevada and worked briefly in Glendale, California, before moving to her husband's hometown of Phoenix, Arizona, in 1970. The couple later moved to Glendale, Arizona, where he became a successful chiropractor, in addition to finding some real estate success. They settled in the Deer Valley section of Phoenix.

Brewer and her husband had three sons, one of whom died of cancer in 2007.  Another son, Ronald Brewer, was declared not guilty by reason of insanity for the rape of a Phoenix woman in 1989; he was a psychiatric patient for many years in the Arizona State Hospital. His case file was sealed by a Phoenix judge shortly before Brewer became governor. Ronald Brewer died in November 2018.

Political career

State legislature
Initially interested in running for school board, Brewer soon saw an opening in her local legislative district, and decided to run for State Representative. Brewer went on to sit in the Arizona House of Representatives for three years, from 1983 to 1987, before deciding to run for the Arizona Senate, where she sat from 1987 to 1996. As state senator, she sought legislation with the intention of creating an office of lieutenant governor in the state, arguing that holding the office of secretary of state does not make a candidate qualified for governor, and that the office should be filled by a member of the same party, should a vacancy arise. During her last three years as a state senator, she held the senior leadership position of majority whip.

In 1996, Brewer ran for chairman of the Maricopa County Board of Supervisors, defeating the incumbent, Ed King, and was on the board for six years. She inherited a debt of $165 million.

Secretary of State of Arizona

In early 2002, Brewer created a campaign committee to run for the office of Secretary of State of Arizona, to replace outgoing secretary of state Betsey Bayless. Brewer ran against the Phoenix councilman Sal DiCiccio in the primary race and won by a narrow margin of just 23,000 votes.

As secretary of state, Brewer instituted a vote-by-fax program for overseas military troops, which was later adopted by other municipalities, including San Francisco. Brewer also helped to marshal changes brought about by Arizona Proposition 200, which required citizens in the state to show proof of citizenship before registering to vote or applying for public benefits.

Governor of Arizona
Governor Janet Napolitano was selected by President Barack Obama to be the Secretary of Homeland Security in the United States Cabinet. Since Arizona has no lieutenant governor, the Secretary of State stands first in the line of succession if he or she holds that post as a result of an election. Despite her earlier quarrels with the line of succession while serving in the State Senate, Brewer was sworn in as governor after Napolitano resigned from her position on January 21, 2009. She became Arizona's fourth female governor and its third consecutive female governor.

In her inaugural address, Brewer promised to keep taxes low in Arizona, in an attempt to attract business from other states, including California. Fewer than two months into her term, however, Brewer proposed a tax increase in front of the State Legislature, prompting Republican state Sen. Ron Gould to walk out of the address mid-speech. Attempting to rationalize the tax increase, Brewer stated that she was ultimately forced to ask for the increase due to the state's $4 billion state budget deficit.

On April 23, 2010, Brewer signed the Support Our Law Enforcement and Safe Neighborhoods Act, otherwise known as Arizona SB1070, into law, making it "a state crime for illegal immigrants to not have an alien registration document", and requiring police "to question people about their immigration status if there is reason". It also makes it illegal for people to hire illegal immigrants for day labor or to knowingly transport them. In addition, it provides provisions to allow citizens to file lawsuits against government agencies that hinder enforcement of immigration laws. A follow-on bill, said to address certain "racial profiling" issues with the original bill, was passed by the Arizona legislature just before ending their 2010 session, and was signed by Brewer on April 30, 2010. Signing of the bill has led to massive demonstrations in Arizona, Washington, D.C. and many other cities across the United States, both for and against the legislation.

On June 3, 2010, Brewer met with President Barack Obama to discuss immigration along Mexico's border with Arizona, and how the federal government could work together with state officials to combat violence there. Brewer remarked after the meeting, "I am encouraged that there is going to be much better dialogue between the federal government and the state of Arizona now." According to press reports, about 1200 national guard troops would be stationed along the border.

On August 24, 2010, Brewer won the Republican primary, to face Arizona Attorney General Terry Goddard in the general election. Brewer was elected in her own right on November 2, 2010, to the office of governor in the state's 2010 gubernatorial election, earning 55% of the states votes over Democrat Terry Goddard with 42%. Polling conducted after Brewer's signing of Arizona SB1070 had shown her as an early favorite in the general election, and she was sworn in for a full term on January 3, 2011, on the State Capitol grounds in Phoenix.

As a result of a ballot measure approved by the voters in 2000, redistricting in Arizona is entrusted to a five-member panel with an independent chair. In 2011, Republicans wanted more favorable lines than those drawn by the commission, and Brewer sent a letter purporting to remove Colleen Mathis, the independent chair, from office. The Arizona Supreme Court ruled that Brewer's action was illegal and it reinstated Mathis.

Brewer was not able to run for a second full four-year term in 2014. The Arizona Constitution limits the governor to two consecutive terms, regardless of whether they are full or partial terms. However, former governors are allowed to seek additional nonconsecutive terms after a four-year respite. In November 2012, Brewer declared she was looking into what she called "ambiguity" in Arizona's term-limit law to seek a third term. In February 2014, Brewer reiterated that she was considering running for re-election, but on March 12, 2014, she announced that she would not attempt to seek another term in office, which would have required what The Arizona Republic called a "long-shot court challenge".

On February 26, 2014, Brewer vetoed Arizona SB 1062( a bill allowing business owners to refuse services to homosexuals) that was passed by the state legislature.

Post-governorship 
In late March 2017, during a phone interview, Brewer expressed opposition to President Trump's American Health Care Act: "This would devastate the most vulnerable, this would devastate rural hospitals, they will probably close down and those jobs would be lost".

Political positions

Budget
A challenge Brewer faced when she took office in 2009 was to resolve a multibillion-dollar budget shortfall that was the most dire of any state in the nation. To combat the deficit, the Governor established a decision making process that forced Arizona to clearly define the appropriate role and scope of State Government and to focus narrowly on delivering those necessary services in the most effective and prudent manner possible.

Brewer's response to the fiscal crisis consisted of two main components.  First, she reduced the size and scope of state government while prioritizing funding for public safety and education.

Second, she proposed a three-year temporary sales tax increase, which voters approved. The proposal was intended to raise 1 billion dollars a year in order to reduce the $3 billion/year deficit. She also borrowed approximately $1 billion in an attempt to match expenditures.

The temporary sales tax expired as planned in 2014. The State has funded the rainy day fund to the tune of $450 million.

Economic initiatives
Brewer created the Arizona Commerce Authority (ACA) as the statewide economic development organization. The ACA board of directors consists of business people, with the intent to focus on business attraction, retention and expansion in Arizona's economic sectors.

The governor also armed the ACA with a $25 million deal closing fund to help attract employers and replaced incentive programs with performance based tax credits.

With the help of the ACA, Arizona employers have created nearly 175,000 new jobs with 4.9 billion dollars in new capital investment. The ACA is also engaged in a national and international campaign to increase business attraction and direct foreign investment.

Arizona Biomedical Corridor
In 2013, Arizona State University, the Mayo Clinic and the City of Phoenix established the Arizona Biomedical Corridor through contractor KUD International. Brewer guided the State Selection Boards' approval of a beneficiary re-designation on 25 acres of State Trust land whereby trust lands designated for K-12 education were exchanged for university lands. This allows the implementation of Arizona State University's plans to establish post-secondary education and research facilities closely tied to the Mayo Hospital's mission.

Tax reforms
During Brewer's tenure Arizona's tax code underwent significant changes. In addition to the increase in sales tax Brewer reduced business property and equipment taxes and corporate income tax. She eliminated the tax on energy sales to manufacturers.

In addition to shifting tax rates away from business, she also undertook a simplification of tax filings. Brewer convened a task force in 2012 to develop recommendations that would simplify the tax code, reduce taxpayer confusion and improve compliance and efficiency.  Thanks to legislation enacted in 2013 and 2014, many task force recommendations are now law and have phased in throughout 2015, including single point of administration and collection, a single and uniform audit program, uniform state and city licensing procedures, and prime contracting relief for trade and service contractors.

Tort reform
Brewer signed Tort reform legislation which included a monetary cap on appeal bonds and a cap on damages. She also signed legislation to adopt the Daubert standard.

Education

K-12 reform
Brewer enacted policies that gave schools A-F letter grades, provided additional funding to schools that improved student performance, and evaluated and rewarded teachers based on effectiveness rather than seniority.

State charter school funding

Brewer expanded access to private schools by increasing tax credits for school tuition organizations and creating empowerment scholarship accounts. Since 2010, charter school enrollment increased by more than 30,000 students and funding for private school choice options increased by more than 50%.

Ethnic studies

On May 11, 2010, Brewer signed into law legislation that banned the teaching of ethnic studies classes in Arizona public schools.

Higher education
Since 2010, Arizona's public institutions have increased the number of certificates and degrees awarded by more than 28%.

Health care
Arizona, at Brewer's direction, joined a coalition of 26 other states to fight the Affordable Care Act (ACA) in the U.S. Supreme Court. The court, however, upheld most of the ACA's provisions. One of the sections that the Court made optional was the requirement that states expand Medicaid eligibility to childless adults at or below 133% of the federal poverty level (FPL).

The court decision had unique implications for Arizona because the voters had already expanded Medicaid coverage to all individuals up to 100% of FPL when they passed Proposition 204 in 2000.

After much debate, the Governor's Medicaid Restoration plan was enacted, taking Federal money through the ACA to expand Medicaid.

Behavioral health
To serve individuals who have a serious mental illness (SMI) but do not qualify for Medicaid, $39 million was added to the budget for additional services.  Arizona ranks fifth nationally in spending on community-based programs and has the fewest residents per capita living in a state psychiatric hospital.

Arizona's behavioral health system for Maricopa County individuals with SMI has been overseen by the Arnold v. Sarn lawsuit for more than thirty years. Brewer and the plaintiffs reached an agreement that ends this litigation by reaffirming Arizona's commitment to a community-based behavioral health system of care.  The agreement ensures that Arizona will continue to provide community-based services such as supported housing, supported employment, peer support and assertive treatment teams.

The agreement builds national behavioral health standards into the system, requires an annual quality service review to determine if patient needs are being identified and addressed and an annual independent service capacity analysis be performed to ensure there are sufficient providers to meet patient needs.

The agreement is structured so that it remains enforceable by the courts should Arizona not live up to its commitments in the future. This guarantees Arizona will maintain its commitment to a community-based behavioral health system.

Brewer directed the Arizona Department of Health Services to integrate behavioral and physical health care for Title XIX eligible SMI members through a "Recovery through Whole Health" program.

Health care cuts

In the face of a mounting budget crisis in Arizona, Brewer signed the 2011 legislative budget, which eliminates the Arizona variant of the State Children's Health Insurance Program, known as KidsCare, that provides health insurance to uninsured children whose families' income exceeds the Medicaid cutoff. According to the FY 2011 budget, enrollment caps will also be put into place for Arizona Health Care Cost Containment System (AHCCCS), thereby limiting access to the program. Brewer, at a press conference, said the state had no choice but to eliminate the free health care programs saying, "We do not have the money  We are broke."

In 2011, Brewer stopped Medicaid funding for organ transplants to save $1.4 million; 98 patients were waiting for transplants. After criticism, the funding was restored.

Brewer called a special session of the Arizona Legislature to join in the class-action lawsuit by 21 state Attorneys General to challenge the constitutionality of that part of the Patient Protection and Affordable Care Act, which establishes a federal individual mandate to purchase health insurance. The mandate was considered by legislators and insurers <ref>"Policymakers, as well as members of our community, are concerned that individuals with pre-existing conditions often have difficulty obtaining coverage. The flip side of this problem, however, is that many people put off getting insurance until after a medical problem has developed, thereby driving up coverage costs for everyone else. We propose to address this dual challenge head-on by making coverage broadly and fairly available" (and propose that reform should)" combine guarantee-issue coverage with no pre-existing condition exclusions with an enforceable individual mandate" Health care reform proposals of America's Health Insurance Plans, an industry lobby group.</ref>

In 2013 Brewer defended her support for Obamacare, and called it a "moral issue".

Human services
Brewer abolished the Child Protective Services (CPS) department and created the Department of Child Safety (DCS) – a permanent, stand-alone agency with the express mission of safeguarding Arizona's abused and neglected children. As part of the new agency, the Office of Child Welfare Investigations will continue to investigate the highest priority cases of criminal conduct.

All 6,596 cases that were previously not investigated have been investigated and closed. A quarter of the 12,695 inactive cases have already been closed and the entire backlog will be reopened and reviewed by January 2015.

Brewer created a Human Trafficking Council to implement best practices, promote greater collaboration with law enforcement, state agencies and the community-at-large and raise public awareness about victims' services, restitution and prevention.

Brewer established the Arizona SERVES Task Force to improve the working relationships between the state, non-profit organizations and community and faith-based entities. The governor also created the Office of Faith and Community Partnerships and the Council on Faith and Community Partnerships. The office is a statewide faith and community initiative resource and promotes service and volunteerism throughout the state.

State government reform
As governor, Brewer reformed its personnel system, toward a system modeled after the private sector. As part of the reform effort, a number of pivotal actions were implemented including consolidating the Governor's control over personnel, implementing at-will workforce, implemented a performance management system and pay practices to recognize and reward top performers, and other measures.

By March 2013, 80% of the employees were at-will. In 2015, on average over 100 employees volunteered every pay period to go from being covered to uncovered, at-will.

Brewer implemented changes to the procurement system. Brewer also implemented changes to the state retirement plan, ending the retirement plan for elected officials, increasing the requirements to qualify for state retirement, and established Alternate Contribution Rate for employees that return to work.

 Immigration and border security 

On June 27, 2010, Brewer appeared on Sunday Square Off, broadcast on KPNX-TV. While speaking on the subject of crime related to illegal immigration, she said that "law enforcement agencies have found bodies in the desert either buried or just lying out there that have been beheaded", a claim that has been disputed. Brewer later said that she "misspoke".

On July 11, 2010, Brewer announced that $10 million given to her state by the federal government, most of which was intended to go to education, would instead go to enforcing border security.

In accordance with her long standing anti-immigrant policies, Brewer signed Arizona SB 1070 into law in 2010, creating a significant controversy. SB 1070 made it a state misdemeanor for an alien to be in Arizona without carrying the required documents, as well as other provisions. When the Obama Administration challenged SB 1070 in court the Governor defended the law. Additionally, she repeatedly urged President Obama and Congress to utilize the National Guard, Border Patrol agents and technology to secure the southern border once and for all.

In addition to signing Arizona SB 1070, she has prohibited state and local governments from giving any public benefits to illegal aliens and made it a misdemeanor for a state or local government official to fail to report immigration law violations discovered while administering a public benefit or service. Brewer has also supported efforts to re-deploy the Arizona National Guard along the southern Arizona border, in an attempt to provide increased border security.

In February 2016, Brewer endorsed businessman Donald Trump for President of the United States, praising his views on immigration:

Abortion
Brewer signed legislation that authorized the Department of Health Services to conduct unannounced inspections of abortion clinics.

 Gun laws 
Brewer prohibited local governments from maintaining a list of citizens who possess a firearm or enacting firearm regulations that are more stringent than state law, made it easier to claim self-defense in a shooting, allowed lawful gun owners to enter a restaurant or bar with a concealed weapon unless specifically prohibited by the establishment owner, and allowed U.S. citizens to carry a concealed firearm in Arizona without a permit.Guns & Ammo has ranked Arizona the best state for gun owners.

In July 2009, Brewer signed SB 1113, which entitles people in Arizona to carry concealed guns in bars or restaurants as long as they do not consume alcohol, and the business has not specifically posted a sign in accordance with Arizona law that guns are not to be permitted on the premises. Brewer also signed SB 1168, a measure that bans property owners from prohibiting the storage of firearms in locked vehicles parked on their lots. She signed SB 1243, which allows a person who is threatened to announce that they are armed, or display or place their hand on their firearm before the use of deadly force. In April 2010, Brewer signed SB 1108, which removes the licensure requirement for law-abiding citizens who choose to carry a concealed firearm in the state of Arizona — the third state in the union with such a law after Vermont and Alaska. Brewer is a member and supporter of the National Rifle Association, as well as the Arizona Rifle and Pistol Association. On April 18, 2011, Brewer vetoed two bills, one setting a mandate that anyone running for president must have proof of U.S. citizenship, and the other allowing guns on college campuses.

Natural resources

Under Brewer, Arizona stepped up its efforts to decrease forest fire risk by thinning approximately 29,000 forested acres on state land.

Under Brewer's direction, the State Land Department negotiated a $200 million, 60.9 mile long high pressure natural gas pipeline beginning west of the Tucson Mountain Park and continuing south along State Highway 286 to the United States border with Mexico near Sasabe, Arizona, largely traveling through state trust land.

Brewer directed the Arizona Department of Water Resources to develop Arizona's Next Century: A Strategic Vision for Water Supply Sustainability, a document outlining Arizona's water use plan. The "Vision" was the necessary first step, organizing the state into 22 planning areas and envisioning options.

Brewer issued Executive Order 2013–02 to develop land and natural resources management strategies for sustainable economic growth and establishing the National Resources Review Council (NRRC). The NRRC prepared an Interim Report containing recommendations from five subcommittees (Clearinghouse, Engagement and Partnering, GIS, Mitigation and Conservation Banking and Planning). The recommendations start with the creation of a single point of contact (OSPB) that will receive all federal natural resource requests and make sure all appropriate state natural resource agencies have been notified and help coordinate appropriate response(s) on behalf of the state.

Energy

Under Brewer, Arizona went from number six in the nation for solar to number three.

In October 2014, Brewer announced the creation of the Arizona Collaboratory for Advanced Energy Solutions (AZ CAES), which was a partnership of industry, Arizona universities, government, non-profits and national laboratories designed to increase Arizona's competitive advantage in securing public funding, private funding and sponsored energy research at the three state universities.

Brewer adopted a state energy plan and established energy goals for Arizona in 2014. The plan was designed to increase solar development; promote energy education and energy sector apprenticeship and job training opportunities; reduce energy use in state buildings through the creation of $1.1 million revolving loan fund for energy efficiency projects; and create a State Energy Advisory Board to address energy issues on an annual basis.

Arizona's Energy Assurance Plan was updated with a grant from the U.S. Department of Energy.  Last updated in 2006, the plan identified clear channels of communication and procedures in the event of an extended energy emergency.  Multiple energy emergency table-top drills and training on city, state and regional levels were conducted with participants from all energy sectors.

Due to a change in Mexican law opening up energy markets between the United States and Mexico, a bi-national energy assessment was completed.  Presented to Brewer and Sonora Governor Padres, both signed a Declaration of Cooperation between the two states to evaluate on an ongoing basis viable energy exchange opportunities. The Governor's office led a 19-member task force and held meetings in Hermosillo, Sonora and Nogales, Arizona to complete this assessment. The Task Force formed international contacts for future bi-national electricity transmission projects.

 Military affairs 

As governor, Brewer pushed for keeping Arizona military bases open.
Brewer also granted in-state student status for the purposes of tuition at any Arizona public university or community college to any person honorably discharged from the US Armed Forces. Additionally, she allowed children of active duty military parents to qualify for Empowerment Scholarship Accounts.  She also extended professional licensing to include military experience.

 Judicial appointments 
During Brewer's time as governor, she filled a number of vacancies in the courts. She appointed three State Supreme Court judges, Ann Timmer, John Pelander, and Robert M. Brutinel, all Republicans.  She also appointed a number of Superior and Appellate Court judges. She was criticized for promoting judges primarily from the Republican Party.

Same-sex marriage and domestic partnership
Brewer supported Arizona Proposition 107, which would have defined marriage as between a man and a woman. This 2006 referendum, which would have prevented both same-sex marriage and civil unions in the state, did not pass – the first time U.S. voters rejected an attempt to ban same-sex marriage. However, in 2008, another proposition that banned same sex marriage (but not civil unions) passed.

Brewer signed a law repealing legislation put into place by former governor Janet Napolitano, which had granted domestic partners of state employees the ability to be considered as "dependents", similar to the way married spouses are handled.

According to an editorial in the Arizona Daily Star on October 13, 2009, the Department of Administration in Arizona "stated that about 800 state employees are affected and that the cost to insure domestic partners is about $3 million of the $625 million the state spends on benefits". However, the state was giving those employees another year of coverage, due to legal necessity: "A legal review determined existing contracts with state employees will be honored."

A federal lawsuit, Diaz v. Brewer, formerly Collins v. Brewer, challenging Brewer's action is being heard in federal court. The plaintiffs, represented by Lambda Legal, an LGBT rights advocacy group, asked for summary judgment based on due process and equal protection claims. On July 23, 2010, U.S. District Judge John W. Sedwick denied the due process claim, but based on the equal protection claim he issued a temporary injunction blocking enforcement of the law pending a trial. Brewer appealed the decision to the United States Court of Appeals for the Ninth Circuit, which sided with Sedwick and ruled against her. The state appealed to the Supreme Court, which denied the appeal, letting the Ninth Circuit ruling stand.

 Author 
Brewer is the author of Scorpions for Breakfast: My Fight Against Special Interests, Liberal Media, and Cynical Politicos to Secure America's Border, published November 2011 by Broadside Books.
Brewer is a New York Times Best Selling Author with Scorpions for Breakfast'' having reached the New York Times Best Seller lists for e-book nonfiction and combined print and e-book nonfiction.

Awards 
Brewer received 2014/15 Heritage Award from the Arizona Chamber of Commerce and Industry.

See also

List of female secretaries of state in the United States

References

External links

 
 

|-

|-

|-

|-

|-

|-

1944 births
21st-century American non-fiction writers
21st-century American women writers
Activists from California
American Lutherans
American people of English descent
American people of Norwegian descent
American political writers
Republican Party Arizona state senators
County supervisors in Arizona
Living people
Republican Party members of the Arizona House of Representatives
People from Glendale, Arizona
People from Hollywood, Los Angeles
Politicians from Los Angeles
Republican Party governors of Arizona
Secretaries of State of Arizona
Women state constitutional officers of Arizona
Women state governors of the United States
Women state legislators in Arizona
Writers from Arizona
Writers from Los Angeles
People from Hawthorne, Nevada
American women non-fiction writers